The Tale of Fedot the Strelets is a play poem by Russian writer and actor Leonid Filatov, written in 1985 and first published in Yunost in 1987.  With a storyline based on Russian folk tales, 'Fedot' is a social and political satire on contemporary realities of life in Russia.  Characters mix archaic Russian language, typical for folklore, with neologisms of modern Russian, providing additional comic effect.

Film adaptations have been made in 1988, 2000 and 2008.

Plot 
The storyline is based on the folk tale Go I Know Not Whither and Fetch I Know Not What

Fedot, a strelets, serves at Tsar's court as the royal hunter. Tsar orders him to provide the game for his dinner with English embassinger. Fedot was unlucky: he got not a single bird.  When he tried to shoot at least a dove, it turned into a beautiful maid, Marusya (Mary), which Fedot adopted as his wife.  Marusia, possessing magical skills, saves her man from Tsar's punishment: she summons Tit Kuzmich and Frol Fomich (two magical servants being a sort of genie, who could and would perform anything Marusya orders), and they fill Tsar's table with food.

Tsar makes his diplomacy with the English noble, in hope to make him marry Tsar's daughter, the Princess, who is not beautiful enough to attract the suiters. Princess and her Nanny, an old angry woman, are not pleased and argue against the match with an ambassador, who seem greedy and stupid to them.

After the dinner, the General, leader of the secret police, arrives to the Tsar. He tells his senior about Fedot's new pretty wife, and Tsar begins to plan how to steal Marusya from Fedot. He orders General to find a task for Fedot which he would be impossible to complete and it would let Tsar to execute Fedot for incompetency.

General goes to the forest, where old witch Baba Yaga lives, and asks her advice. With her magic, Yaga finds the way. Tsar should order Fedot to bring him next day a magic carpet on which the whole Russia could be seen just like on a map. Tsar calls Fedot and orders him the carpet, Fedot feels low, but Marusia and her magic servants solve the problem and bring the carpet at morning.

Tsar, though trying to seem happy, is upset. He calls General again, threatening he will be punished if no plan will be given.  General, also upset, goes back to Baba Yaga, who gives him another plan.  Now Tsar orders Fedot to bring him next day a golden-horned deer, which is thought to not exist at all.  But Marusia and her servants bring the deer as well.

Tsar forces General, General forces Yaga, and the final plan is prepared. The new task for Fedot is to find Something That Could Not Be in the World. Even Tit Kuzmich and Frol Fomich are unable to find a thing so loosely described. Fedot sets up to journey for his goal, leaving his young wife at home. A few days later, Tsar, despite being continually mocked by the Nanny for this, arrives with the wedding gifts to Marusya. The young woman refuses to betray Fedot for old and vile Tsar, she turns into a dove and flies away.

Fedot is wandering the world in quest for Something That Could Not Be.  Shipwreck puts him on an uninhabited island.  Its only master is a Voice, a bodyless yet powerful spirit, who is living a boring life: he can summon himself any good he wants, but the only thing he longs for is human company. Fedot, realizing he has found his goal, persuades the spirit to join him on his way back to the Russian Tsar.

Returning home, Fedot discovers his house devastated by Tsar, and Marusya tells him about Tsar's harassment. Fedot calls to the simple Russian people to help him avenge the injustice, and they rise up. The crowd storms into Tsar's palace. Tsar, General and Baba Yaga, caught in charge, each cowardly try to pass the buck to the two others. People sentence them to sail away in a bucket overseas. Then Fedot refuses a marriage offering from Princess, leaving her with his promise to find her another man, his twin. The tale ends up with the feast, supplied by Something-That-Could-Not-Be's magic.

Characters
Scomoroch - the storyteller's voice
Fedot, a strelets
Marusya, his wife and magician
Tsar of Russia
Tsarevna, his daughter
Nanny, an old sarcastic woman
The General
 Baba Yaga, the old witch
Something-That-Could-Not-Be-in-the World, the bodyless spirit
English embassinger
Native embassinger
Tit Kuzmich and Frol Fomich, Marusya's servants

Adaptations
In 1988, a 56-minute film was made starring Leonid Filatov himself reciting the tale.
In 2000, a live-action version was filmed, starring Victor Suchorukov as Something-That-Could-Not-Be.
An animated adaptation by Melnitsa Animation Studio premiered on December 12, 2008 in Moscow. It has no official English title and has been referred to in the press by many different titles including variations of Fedot the Hunter, Fedot the Shooter and The Tale of Fedot the Archer.

Bibliography
 .

External links
English version of the poem translated by  Alec Vagapov
bilingual version (Russian-English)

Russian poems
Russian plays
Russian political satire
Russian satirical poems
Satirical plays
Satirical books
1985 poems
1985 plays